Městský fotbalový stadion (Czech for City football stadium) may refer to many football stadiums in the Czech Republic:
 Městský fotbalový stadion Srbská in Brno
 Městský fotbalový stadion Miroslava Valenty in Uherské Hradiště
 Městský stadion (Benešov)
 Městský stadion (Karviná)
 Městský stadion (Mladá Boleslav)
 Městský stadion (Opava)
 Městský stadion (Ostrava)
 Městský stadion (Ústí nad Labem)
 Městský stadion (Znojmo)